Picket Guard Peak is a 12,302-foot-elevation (3,750 meter) mountain summit located west of the crest of the Sierra Nevada mountain range in Tulare County, California.

History

William Russel Dudley, writing in the Sierra Club Bulletin in 1898: "There is a fine pyramidal peak at the eastern end of the third range, which was always in the background of the view as we entered and ascended the narrow cleft of the Kern-Kaweah. This was named the Picket Guard." 
This landform's toponym was officially adopted in 1928 by the U.S. Board on Geographic Names.

The first ascent of the summit was made August 1, 1936, by C. Dohlman, H. Manheim, and B. Breeding. Except for the north cirque, an ascent of the peak is non-technical, and inclusion on the Sierra Peaks Section peakbagging list generates climbing interest in this remote peak.

Climate
According to the Köppen climate classification system, Picket Guard Peak is located in an alpine climate zone. Most weather fronts originate in the Pacific Ocean, and travel east toward the Sierra Nevada mountains. As fronts approach, they are forced upward by the peaks (orographic lift), causing them to drop their moisture in the form of rain or snowfall onto the range. Precipitation runoff from this mountain drains east to the Kern River via Picket Creek and Kern-Kaweah River.

See also
 
 List of mountain peaks of California

Gallery

References

External links
 Weather forecast: Picket Guard Peak
 Picket Guard Peak (photo): Flickr

Mountains of Tulare County, California
Mountains of Sequoia National Park
North American 3000 m summits
Mountains of Northern California
Sierra Nevada (United States)